The K-Pex 100 (Kingston Portable Entertainment eXperience) is a portable media player produced by Kingston Technologies. It is capable of playing transcoded videos (.mpx), viewing still images (.jpg), and playing music files (.mp3, .wma). It also comes with 2 games. It is a rebranded Cenix GMP-M6, which is from Korea. Production of the K-PEX has been discontinued.

Supported formats
The Kingston K-Pex-100 is capable of playing various formats of audio, video, picture, and game files.

Audio formats
MP3, WAV, WMA (protected), Ogg (Q10)

Video formats
WMV, ASF, MPEG 1 & 2, and AVI can be transcoded into the supported MPX format. The .mpx format is based on the mp4 format. It is unclear what codec it uses for both video and audio. The transcoded files are transcoded to the exact size of the screen to ensure minimum file size.

Picture formats
JPEG

Game formats
SGS

External links
Kingston Technologies K-PEX profile

Portable media players